Michael Mansell may refer to:
Michael Mansell (born 1951), Tasmanian Aboriginal activist and lawyer
Mickey Mansell (born 1973), darts player from Northern Ireland